Roz can refer to:

People

Given name
Roz, short for Rosalyn, Rosa, Rosalind, and many other forms, is a first name which can refer to:
 Roz Abrams (born 1949), American television journalist
 Roz Bell, Canadian singer-songwriter
 Roz Chast (born 1954), American cartoonist
 Roz Hammond, Australian comic actress and writer
 Roz Hanby (born 1951), English flight attendant, noted for her British Airways commercials
 Roz Howard (1922–2013), (male) American stock car racing driver
 Roz Joseph (born 1926), American photographer
 Roz Kaveney (born 1949), British writer and editor
 Roz Kelly (born 1943), American actress
 Roz McCall, Scottish politician
 Roz Picard (born 1962), American scientist and founder of Affective Computing
 Roz Ryan (born 1951), American actress
 Roz Savage (born 1967), British ocean rower, environmental advocate, writer and speaker
 Roz Weston, (male) Canadian entertainment reporter
 Roz Witt, American television and film actress

Surname
 Ali Roz, Lebanese journalist, Managing Editor of Kuwait's daily newspaper Al Rai

Fictional characters
 Roz, a snail-like monster character in the Monsters, Inc. franchise
 Roz the babysitter, from the film Eyes Wide Shut
 Roz Doyle, a radio producer from the television series Frasier played by Peri Gilpin.
 Roz Harmison, love interest of Santiago Munez in the Goal! (film series)
 Roz Keith, from the movie Nine to Five
 Roz Patterson, character in the Australian police drama series Blue Heelers
 Roz Russell, the third female bailiff on the series Night Court played by Marsha Warfield
 Roz, a demon-like character featured in At Lojart's videos

Places
 Roz-Landrieux, a commune in the Ille-et-Vilaine department in Brittany in northwestern France
 Roz-sur-Couesnon, a commune in the Ille-et-Vilaine department in Brittany in northwestern France

See also
 Kaahin Kissii Roz, an Indian thriller drama television series